Anocellidus is a genus of flatworms belonging to the order Polycladida. It is the only genus in the monotypic family Anocellidae and is represented by the single species Anocellidus profundus.

References

Platyhelminthes